Oliver William Wolters  (8 June 1915 – 5 December 2000) was a British academic, historian and author. He was also a Malayan civil servant and administrator.  At his death, he was the Goldwin Smith Professor of Southeast Asian History Emeritus at Cornell University.

Selected works
In a statistical overview derived from writings by and about O. W. Wolters, OCLC/WorldCat encompasses roughly 20+ works in 90+ publications in 4 languages and 2,200+ library holdings.  

 The Khmer King at Basan (1371-1373) and the Restoration of the Cambodian Chronology during the 14th and 15th Centuries (1965)
 Early Indonesian Commerce: a Study of the Origins of Srĭvijaya. (1962)
 Some Reflections on the Subject of Ayudhyā and the World (1967)
 Southeast Asian History and Historiography: Essays Presented to D.G.E. Hall (1976)
 History, Culture and Region in Southeast Asian Perspectives (1982) 
 The Fall of Śrīvijaya in Malay History (1970)
Culture and Region in Southeast Asian Perspectives (1982) 
 Two essays on Đại-Việt in the Fourteenth Century (1988)
 Perdagangan awal Indonesia: satu kajian asal usul kerajaan Srivijaya (1989)
 Early Southeast Asia: Selected Essays (2008)
 Monologue, Dialogue, and Tran Vietnam (2009)

Honors
 Guggenheim Fellowship, 1972
 Association for Asian Studies (AAS), 1990 Award for Distinguished Contributions to Asian Studies

Notes

References
"Oliver W. Wolters," SEAP Bulletin (US). Winter/Spring 2002, p. 3
  "Oliver William Wolters, 85, Malay Scholar," New York Times (US). 16 December 2000

External links
Monologue, Dialogue and Tran Vietnam: A manuscript composed of materials completed by O. W. Wolters before his death PDF

1915 births
2000 deaths
Historians of Southeast Asia
Alumni of SOAS University of London
Cornell University faculty
Cornell University Department of History faculty
20th-century British historians